"Here Comes Santa Claus (Right Down Santa Claus Lane)" is a popular Christmas song written and originally performed by Gene Autry, with music composed by Oakley Haldeman. Autry's original recording (in which he pronounces Santa Claus as "Santy Claus") was a top-10 hit on the pop and country charts; the song would go on to be covered many times in the subsequent decades.

History

Autry got the idea for the song after riding his horse in the 1946 Santa Claus Lane Parade (now the Hollywood Christmas Parade) in Los Angeles, during which crowds of spectators chanted, "Here comes Santa Claus". This inspired him to write a song that Haldeman set to music. Autry's lyrics combined two veins of the Christmas tradition, the mythology of Santa Claus and the Christian origin of the holiday (most explicitly in its mention of the nativity promise of "peace on Earth" to those who "follow the light"). A demo recording was made by singer/guitarist Johnny Bond, whose recording made use of ice cubes to mimic the sound of jingling sleigh bells. This inspired the use of real sleigh bells in Autry's own recording of the song.

Autry first recorded the song on August 28, 1947; released as a single by Columbia Records, It became a No. 5 country and No. 9 pop hit. Autry performed the song in his 1949 movie The Cowboy and the Indians. He re-recorded it again in 1953 for Columbia, and once more in 1957 for his own Challenge Records label, which released it on more than one album that year.

Other artists to record the song include Doris Day (1949), Bing Crosby and the Andrews Sisters (recorded May 10, 1949), Elvis Presley (1957), the Ray Conniff Singers (1959), Keely Smith (1960), David Seville and His Chipmunks (1961), Bob B. Soxx & the Blue Jeans (1963), Hank Thompson (1964), in excerpt by The Beach Boys as part of their song "Child of Winter" (1974), Willie Nelson (1979), Glen Campbell, RuPaul, The Wiggles (1997), Billy Idol (2006), Bob Dylan (2009), Mariah Carey (2010), Chicago (2011), the Glee cast (2013), Anna Kendrick (2015), and Pentatonix (2018). In 1988, "Here Comes Santa Claus" was featured in Very Merry Christmas Songs which is part of the Disney Sing Along Songs collection. The song was also featured prominently in the popular 1989 Christmas movie National Lampoon's Christmas Vacation during the climax towards the end of the film. The version of the song used was Autry's 1957 Challenge Records recording.

Chart performance (Gene Autry)

References

Songs about Santa Claus
1947 songs
1947 singles
American Christmas songs
The Andrews Sisters songs
Bing Crosby songs
Bob Dylan songs
Elvis Presley songs
Glen Campbell songs
Gene Autry songs
Songs written by Gene Autry
Bob B. Soxx & the Blue Jeans songs
Song recordings produced by Phil Spector
Song recordings with Wall of Sound arrangements